The Newtown Square Branch was a branch line of the Pennsylvania Railroad (PRR) that diverged from the West Chester Branch in Yeadon, Pennsylvania, and ended in Newtown Square, Pennsylvania. The rail line is mostly overgrown and few bridges remain, with the bridge over Baltimore Avenue located at the Upper Darby/East Lansdowne border having been removed in 2003. The only known presence of rails is at the junction just west of the SEPTA's Fernwood-Yeadon station. Through Upper Darby Township the former right-of-way follows PECO's high tension power lines from Fernwood to the Upper Darby/Haverford border at Lansdowne Avenue and Township Line Road.
 
Built as the Philadelphia & Delaware County Railroad in 1888, it was taken over by a subsidiary of the Pennsylvania Railroad in 1894. The Cardington Branch to Millbourne Mills opened the following year in 1895. Passenger service ran on the line until it was terminated in 1908 due to competition from the West Chester Traction Company trolley lines. Of the ten passenger stations along the line, all except Llanerch and Newtown Square were flag stops. These latter two stations featured single-story frame station houses.

The Newtown Square Branch consisted of yards at Pembroke just past Fernwood Junction and seven stations. The stations were Garrett Road, Arlington, Llanerch, Grassland, Brookethorpe, Foxcroft, The Hunt and Newtown Square. Major bridges were at Baltimore Avenue, Naylor's Run, Darby Creek, and Bryn Mawr Avenue. The stone piers from the Darby Creek bridge are still extant, while large concrete abutments remain visible on the west side of Bryn Mawr Avenue south of Goshen Road.

Service past Grassland station ended in 1963 due to the deterioration of the bridges past that point and all service on the line ceased by 1981. Conrail obtained permission to abandon the line in 1982 and removed the tracks and bridges in 1985. The roadbed remains intact, though largely overgrown with weeds and trees. In some cases, private business has obliterated portions of the line. Several areas of the roadbed are accessible to the public, mainly in Naylor Run Park in Upper Darby Township.

At the intersection of Darby Road and West Chester Pike, Haverford Township has created a small park, Llanerch Crossing Park. The Park commemorates the "Battle of Llanerch Junction", an 1895 confrontation at that site between track workers from the PRR and the West Chester Rail Company. Interpretive signs and two murals describe the history of Llanerch Junction.

The western terminus of the line was the Powell Lumber Yard on Newtown Street Road in Newtown Square. The lumber yard burned down in the 1980s. The old freight station was threatened with demolition in the late 1990s. The Newtown Square Historical Preservation Society raised money to have the old freight station moved to its current location west of town at the Drexel Lodge property on West Chester Pike. The Newtown Square Railroad Museum has been created at that location, with engines and other rolling stock, and memorabilia related to the line.

Station list

References

External links

Newtown Square Railroad Museum
Philadelphia & Delaware County Railroad
Route Map and History
Philadelphia Terminal Division Map (Pennsylvania Railroad Historical Society)

Philadelphia, Baltimore and Washington Railroad lines
Rail infrastructure in Pennsylvania
Transportation in Delaware County, Pennsylvania
Railway lines opened in 1888
Railway lines closed in 1981